Cimino is an Italian surname that may refer to:
Cimino family in Italy
Anthony J. Cimino (born 1947), American politician
Chris Cimino, American meteorologist on TV news programs
Cristina Cimino (born 1964), Italian rhythmic gymnast
James Cimino (1928–2010), American endocrinologist
Cimino fistula, an arteriovenous fistula named after James
James J. Cimino, American physician-scientist and biomedical informatician
Jay Cimino, American entrepreneur 2018
Joe Cimino (born c. 1969), Canadian politician 
Leonardo Cimino (1917–2012), American film, television and stage actor 
Michael Cimino (1939–2016), American film director, screenwriter, producer, and author
Michael Cimino (actor) (born 1999), American actor
Pete Cimino (born 1942), American baseball player
Rosalba Cimino (born 1990), Italian politician
Serafino Cimino (1873–1928), Italian Franciscan, bishop and diplomat

See also
Cimini (surname)

Italian-language surnames